Jacksonville Armada FC is an American professional soccer team based in Jacksonville, Florida. They most recently played in the National Premier Soccer League (NPSL), the fourth tier of the American soccer pyramid, during the 2018 season while also retaining their membership in the North American Soccer League (NASL), a league that was in the second tier but postponed its 2018 season.

History 

In May 2013, Jacksonville businessman Mark Frisch and former Major League Soccer player Darío Sala formed Sunshine Soccer Group with the intention of bringing professional soccer to Jacksonville. The effort was bolstered by several successful soccer matches held at TIAA Bank Field, including two national team games that set records for international friendlies. The North American Soccer League invited the group to present a bid for a 2015 expansion team at their July 25, 2013 board meeting. The bid was accepted, and the NASL announced that Jacksonville and Oklahoma City FC would receive franchises for the 2015 season.

The organization has announced that Sala would serve as general manager, and former NFL Europe and Jacksonville Jaguars executive Steve Livingstone will serve as President. On February 18, 2014, the team announced its name would be Jacksonville Armada FC, and that its colors would be navy blue, royal blue, gold, and white. On June 11, 2014, the team announced it had hired former Argentine player José Luis Villarreal as its first head coach.

The team began playing in the 2015 NASL Spring season. After a few pre-season games in February and March, the club played its first league game, at home, on April 4, 2015, defeating FC Edmonton, 3–1. On September 21, 2015, the club announced the dismissal of head coach Guillermo Hoyos, general manager Dario Sala and assistant coaches Edison Ibarra, Sebastian Fabres and Rafael Perez Nino. The Armada stood 11th and last in the North American Soccer League. The decision came just three months after the team had extended Hoyos' contract through the end of 2019. "Following an in-depth analysis of the team and operations, I am confident that a new direction is needed to turn around our team", Armada owner Mark Frisch said in a statement. Director of player development Eric Dade took over through the end of the 2015 NASL season.

On November 24, 2015, the Armada announced U.S. Soccer player Tony Meola as the team's new head coach. After nine months on the job, Meola was fired on August 7, 2016, with Mark Lowry taking over as interim head coach for the remainder of the 2016 Fall Season.

After the 2016 season ended, the NASL lost two teams to the then Div. III United Soccer League. At the time the USL had submitted to be promoted to Div. II with the NASL. Several NASL teams were then rumored to be shutting down or switching leagues as well as the possibility of the league losing its Div. II status. In December 2016, there were several reports stating the Armada were about to fold and had released all their players due to mounting financial losses. The reports turned out to be false but the team did release five of their highest price players. In January 2017, the NASL was approved to keep its Div. II status but Armada owner Frisch confirmed that he was looking to sell the team and that the league would likely be taking over the club.

In July 2017, local entrepreneur Robert Palmer of RP Funding purchased the Armada.

After recording its best season to date in professional soccer during the 2017 season, finishing fifth overall in the NASL while just falling short of a playoff berth, the league lost its Division II sanctioning for the upcoming 2018 season. While the league entered into legal proceeding against the United States Soccer Federation, Armada announced it would field a team in the National Premier Soccer League, an amateur league commonly referred to as part of fourth tier of American soccer, while still retaining membership in the NASL. This team retains the Armada name and replaced the organization's Under-23 team in the NPSL, while merging both sides' rosters.

The Armada clinched its first ever playoff appearance by finishing second overall in the Sunshine Conference, and won its first playoff game against Miami United FC, 4–1, on July 11, 2018. The team later fell to fellow NASL side Miami FC 2 in the conference final, 3–1.

On October 31, 2018, club president Nathan Walter announced that Jacksonville Armada would play in the NPSL in 2019. However on December 10, Walter announced that the team's U-23 side would compete in the 2019 NPSL season as the organization's focus shifted to player development. In the meantime the first team would continue to explore options for a return to competition in 2020.

In November 2019, the organization announced that it proposed an agreement to take over land in downtown Jacksonville for a new stadium. The first team will remain off the field for 2020 while the U-23 side announced a move to the brand new "Gulf Coast Conference" in the NPSL.

League and cup history

Stadium 
On July 11, 2014, the Armada announced they would play their home games at the Baseball Grounds of Jacksonville (later re-dubbed Community First Park) in Downtown Jacksonville for at least three seasons. They hope to later construct their own expandable soccer-specific stadium. In 2017, due to the high costs associated with playing at the Baseball Grounds, the Armada signed a lease to play at Hodges Stadium, a soccer and track and field stadium at the University of North Florida.

The team has also played games in EverBank Field, including their first exhibition game vs the Philadelphia Union, which set a modern-era NASL record for preseason attendance (13,934). It was also the site for their first regular season game, which was a 3–1 victory over FC Edmonton, and set the modern era NASL record for regular season attendance (16,164). The Armada also use Southern Oak Stadium as a venue for US Open Cup matches.

Club culture 
The Coastal Cup was established in 2010 and was originally contested between the Fort Lauderdale Strikers and Tampa Bay Rowdies, but with Jacksonville's entry into the league, the competition became triangular. The league added Miami FC in the 2016 season. This made the Coastal Cup a four team affair. After the 2016 season Tampa Bay left the NASL and joined the United Soccer League, while Fort Lauderdale ceased operations because of financial and legal issues.

The team is cheered on by Section 904, the first supporters' group. Section 904 is known for their singing, drumming, and blue-and-yellow smoke; can be seen behind the goal at every home match. Area code 904 is the telephone area code for all of metropolitan Jacksonville.

Players and staff

Developmental team 

In 2016, the Armada announced that they had formed an under 23 team to play in the National Premier Soccer League (NPSL) as part of their development system. The team, Jacksonville United U-23, replaced Jacksonville United FC in the NPSL. The Armada retained Jacksonville United coach Pat Cannon.

Individual records

Top goalscorers

Most appearances

Managerial records

See also 
 Sports in Jacksonville

References

External links 
 
Jacksonville Armada FC 2018 (NPSL) game logs

 
Sports teams in Jacksonville, Florida
Soccer clubs in Florida
Association football clubs established in 2013
North American Soccer League teams
2013 establishments in Florida